Sung Yu-ri (born March 3, 1981) is a  German-born South Korean actress and singer.

Television series

Film

Variety/radio show

References

South Korean filmographies